RAF Chailey was a Royal Air Force Advanced Landing Ground close to the village of Chailey near Burgess Hill in East Sussex during the Second World War. It was an example of an Advanced Landing Ground (ALG), a type of simple, temporary airfield designed to support the invasion of continental Europe.

History
The airfield was on the site of Bower Farm, and was surveyed and commenced in 1942 by Fighter Command with the intention of creating a fighter station as part of the expansion following the Battle of Britain.  It was not laid out until 1943, by which time the strategy was different and it was passed to the RAF Second Tactical Air Force to become an operating station for the invasion of continental Europe, codenamed Operation Overlord.

In order to construct the airfield, the RAF demolished the local pub, 'The Plough', which was at the end of the runway, and reconstructed it about half a mile away near Plumpton, and this is now the site of the RAF Chailey memorial.

RAF Chailey hosted No. 131 Airfield RAF which became No. 131 (Polish) Wing, with three squadrons: 302, 308 and 317.)

The station's officer commanding was the highest ranking Pole in the RAF, Group Captain Aleksander Gabszewicz.

The airfield was also host to No. 1312 Mobile Wing RAF Regiment

The airfield was de-requisitioned in 1945 and returned to farm use.

References

Citations

Bibliography

External links

Wikimapia map of RAF Chailey
Pictures from Chailey Airshow 2004

Royal Air Force stations in West Sussex
Battle of Britain
Royal Air Force stations of World War II in the United Kingdom
Plumpton, East Sussex